Djiru is a coastal locality in the Cassowary Coast Region, Queensland, Australia.

Geography 
The locality is home to the Djiru National Park, a preservation area for the lowland rainforest in the Wet Tropics that has been vanishing since the European colonisation.

References 

Cassowary Coast Region
Coastline of Queensland
Localities in Queensland